Xochihuehuetlan  is one of the 81 municipalities of Guerrero, in south-western Mexico. The municipal seat lies at Xochihuehuetlan.  The municipality covers an area of 191.6 km².

In 2005, the municipality had a total population of 7,005.

References

Municipalities of Guerrero